Penicillium alutaceum is a fungus species of the genus of Penicillium.

See also
List of Penicillium species

References

alutaceum
Fungi described in 1968